Hyak may refer to:

 Hyak, Washington, United States
 MV Hyak
 Hyak (steamboat 1909)
 Hyak (sternwheeler)